Apoanagyrus is a parasitic wasp genus in the family Encyrtidae.

References

Encyrtidae